State Road 21 is an IB-class road in northern and western Serbia, connecting Novi Sad with Sjenica. It is in Vojvodina and Šumadija and Western Serbia regions.

Before the new road categorization regulation given in 2013, the route had the following names: M 22.1, M 21, M 5, M 21.1 and P 117 (before 2012) / 13 and A4 (after 2012).

The existing route is a main road with two traffic lanes. By the valid Space Plan of Republic of Serbia the section between Novi Sad and Ruma would be upgraded to expressway, while the Požega-Sjenica part would be transferred to the new A2 motorway, providing the faster link between A1 and A3 motorways, also between Belgrade and Montenegrin coast, respectively. Everything is expected to be completed by 2020.

Section from Požega to Požega (Arilje) is a part of European routes E761 and E763.

Sections

See also 
 Roads in Serbia
 European route E761
 European route E763

References

External links
 Official website – Roads of Serbia (Putevi Srbije)
 Official website – Corridors of Serbia (Koridori Srbije) (Serbian)
 Serbian main and regional roads Map (Serbian)

State roads in Serbia